"No Stress" is a 2008 song recorded by the French house record producer and DJ Laurent Wolf. It was the first single from his sixth album Wash My World, on which it features as the first track in its radio edit version, and as the tenth track in the Zen @ Acoustic version. Released in March 2008, this dance and techno song achieved a great success in many countries, including France and Belgium, where it topped the charts.

The vocals are performed by Eric Carter who is not credited as featuring on the single cover. Laurent Wolf also recorded another version of the song with Anggun for the deluxe edition of Wash My World. Wolf and Anggun performed the song at the 2008 World Music Awards in Monaco.

Chart performance
In France, the single went straight to number 2 on March 29, with 4,561 sales, then topped the chart for one week with 5,209 sales, which was at the time in France the number-one single with the lowest weekly sales (this record was beaten by Britney Spears' "Womanizer" on January 10, 2009, with 3,155 sales). It remained on the chart (top 100) for 37 weeks.

"No Stress" was also a hit in Belgium (Wallonia and Flanders), where it hit number one for one week and remained on the chart for a total of 32 weeks. In Switzerland, the song had a peak at number seven and totaled 72 weeks in the top 100.

Track listings
 CD single

 CD maxi

 12" maxi

 Digital download

Personnel
 Written by E.Rima, J.Hills, and L.Wolf
 Performed and produced by Laurent Wolf
 Background vocals by Éric Carter and Anggun
 Recorded at Wolf Project Studio
 Artwork by csublime.com
 Published by ATV / Sony Music Publishing France (Catalog Darkness)

Charts and certifications

Weekly charts

Year-end charts

Certifications

References

External links
 "No Stress", music video

2008 singles
2008 songs
Laurent Wolf songs
Ultratop 50 Singles (Flanders) number-one singles
Ultratop 50 Singles (Wallonia) number-one singles
SNEP Top Singles number-one singles
Disques Vogue singles